Biancalani is a surname. Notable people with the surname include:

Fabio Biancalani (born 1961), Argentine politician
Frédéric Biancalani (born 1974), French footballer

See also
Biancalana